Aavoja Reservoir is located on Aavoja river in Anija Parish, Harju County, Estonia near Kehra.

The reservoir is part of Tallinn water supply system and is connected to Jägala, Pirita and Soodla rivers via canals.

History 
The construction of the reservoir took place between 1980 and 1983.

See also 
 Soodla Reservoir
 Raudoja Reservoir
 Kaunissaare Reservoir
 Paunküla Reservoir
 Vaskjala Reservoir
 Lake Ülemiste
 List of lakes of Estonia

References

Anija Parish
Reservoirs in Estonia
Lakes of Harju County